Marine Drive is an elevated station on the Canada Line of Metro Vancouver's SkyTrain rapid transit system. The station is located at the intersection of Cambie Street and SW Marine Drive in Vancouver, British Columbia.

Location
The station is located on the southeast corner of the intersection of Southwest Marine Drive and Cambie Street. It serves the residential areas of Marpole and the Vancouver South Slope. There are also some shops located across the street from the station, including Marine Gateway, a large retail hub featuring franchises such as A&W, T&T Supermarket, and a Cineplex movie theatre.

Marine Drive station is the only Canada Line station in the City of Vancouver with above-ground station platforms. Near 64th Avenue, just a few blocks north of the station, the line transitions to a cut-and-cover tunnel and remains underground all the way to the northern terminus at Waterfront station. South of Marine Drive station, the line crosses the Fraser River on the North Arm Bridge, a purpose-built bridge similar to the Skybridge for the Expo Line.

Station information

Station layout

Services
The trolleybuses running along Main Street (#3), Granville Street (#10) and Oak Street (#17)—as well as the former trolleybus route on Cambie Street (#15)—have their southern termini located at a bus exchange at Marine Drive station, enabling easy transfers for passengers traveling between Vancouver, Richmond, and the Vancouver International Airport. In addition, passengers can also connect to the #100 bus, which runs along Marine Drive.

Bus routes

The following bus routes can be found in close proximity to Marine Drive station:
3 Downtown (via Main Street)
10 Downtown (via Granville Street)
15 Olympic Village Station (via Cambie Street, then continues Downtown as #50 Waterfront Station)
17 Downtown (via Oak Street)
100 Marpole Loop
100 22nd Street Station
N8 Downtown
N15 Downtown
N20 Downtown

References

External links

Canada Line stations
Railway stations in Canada opened in 2009
Buildings and structures in Vancouver
2009 establishments in British Columbia